Robert Joseph Miller (born March 30, 1945) is an American former attorney and politician who served as the 26th governor of Nevada from 1989 to 1999. A member of the Democratic Party, he had previously served as the 29th lieutenant governor of Nevada from 1987 to 1989. After his re-election in 1994, no Nevada Democrats were elected governor of Nevada until Steve Sisolak won in 2018. As of 2022, he is the most recent Nevada governor to have a lieutenant governor from the opposing party, having served with Republicans Sue Wagner and Lonnie Hammargren.

Life and career
Miller was born in Chicago, Illinois, and moved with his family to Las Vegas, Nevada as a child. His father, Ross Miller, was a bookmaker, who, according to his son's 2013 autobiography, Son of a Gambling Man, had operated on both sides of the law on some of the meaner streets of industrial Chicago.

Bob Miller attended Roman Catholic schools. He graduated from Bishop Gorman High School in 1963 with honors, and from Santa Clara University in 1967, earning a degree in political science. He received his J.D. degree from Loyola Law School in Los Angeles, California.

Miller served in the U.S. Army Reserve from 1967 to 73, and later in the U.S. Air Force Reserve. He served as Clark County Deputy District Attorney from 1971 to 73. In 1978 Miller was elected Clark County District Attorney, and in 1982 became the first holder of that office to win re-election. He was president of the National District Attorneys Association in 1984.

Elected the 29th Lieutenant Governor of Nevada in 1986, Miller was sworn in for a four-year term on January 5, 1987. On January 3, 1989, Miller succeeded to the governorship when Richard Bryan resigned to take a seat in the U.S. Senate. Miller was elected to two full four-year terms as governor, in 1990 and 1994, and served until January 4, 1999; his decade in office made him Nevada's longest-serving governor. Lifetime term limits prevented him from seeking re-election in 1998. He was the last Democrat to serve as Nevada governor until Steve Sisolak in 2019. In 1997–98, he served as chairman of the National Governors Association. Miller has a middle school in Henderson, Nevada named after him, which opened in 1999.

Miller presently serves on the board of directors of Wynn Resorts and International Game Technology. He is the Principal of Robert J. Miller Consulting, which provides business-to-government and business-to-business advice and assistance. He is also a senior advisor with Dutko Worldwide, a bipartisan government relations company headquartered in Washington, D.C.

Family

Miller and his wife, Sandy, have three children, including Ross Miller, who served as Secretary of State of Nevada from 2007 to 2015. He and his wife currently live in Henderson, Nevada.

References

External links

 

|-

|-

|-

|-

|-

1945 births
Bishop Gorman High School alumni
Democratic Party governors of Nevada
District attorneys in Nevada
Lieutenant Governors of Nevada
Living people
Loyola Law School alumni
Military personnel from Illinois
Military personnel from Nevada
Nevada lawyers
Newmont
Politicians from Carson City, Nevada
Politicians from Las Vegas
Politicians from Chicago
Santa Clara University alumni
United States Air Force reservists
United States Army reservists